Stratford-upon-Avon Boat Club is a rowing club on the River Avon, based at The Clubhouse, Recreation Ground, Swan's Nest Lane, Stratford-upon-Avon, Warwickshire.

History
The club was founded on Monday the 10 August, 1874 and is affiliated to British Rowing.

The club has intermittently produced British champions since 1977.

Club colours
The blade colours are: blades: white with crimson & black squares; kit: crimson & black.

Honours

British champions

References

Sport in Warwickshire
Rowing clubs in England
Rowing clubs of the River Avon
Stratford-upon-Avon